King's Highway 26, commonly referred to as Highway 26, is a provincially maintained highway in the Canadian province of Ontario, connecting the cities of Owen Sound and Barrie. Between these two cities, the highway serves the southern shoreline of Georgian Bay, passing through Meaford, Collingwood and Stayner, as well as passing the Blue Mountain Resort. In addition, the highway serves as the main route to Wasaga Beach, a popular recreational destination during the summer months.

Highway26 was first assumed by the Department of Highways, predecessor to the Ministry of Transportation of Ontario, in 1927, along an existing trunk route between Barrie and Owen Sound. Various bypasses, mostly around Collingwood, have improved the route through the intervening years.

Route description 

Highway26 serves as a major link between Barrie and the Greater Toronto Area, via Highway400, and the popular tourist region on the southern shore of Georgian Bay.
Over the past several years the popularity of this region has increased, and traffic levels have increased accordingly.
The routing of the highway takes it from the junction with Highway 6, Highway 10 and Highway 21 in Owen Sound to its terminus at Highway 400 in Barrie at the Bayfield street interchange. For a time, the highway continued southward to Dunlop street, formerly Highway 11, in Barrie, cosigned with Highway27. The southern portion of Bayfield street was downloaded to the City of Barrie along with Dunlop street in 1997, when these sections of Highway27 and Highway11 were eliminated.

Highway26 between Owen Sound and Meaford in the west is not as highly travelled as the tourist areas to the east. From Meaford eastwards, the highway runs along the Georgian Bay shoreline, and in The Blue Mountains, extending from Thornbury eastwards through to the west limits of Collingwood. It passes through a nearly continuous corridor of low-density resort-style residential developments, mostly concentrated in the Blue Mountain Resort area. Between Collingwood and Wasaga Beach, the highway is a four-lane divided roadway with roundabouts transitioning to the undivided sections at both ends: one at Mosely Street in Wasaga Beach, and the other at Poplar Sideroad in Collingwood.

It is also not a very straight route, as the highway makes four 90degree turns: three at signalised intersections, including at High Street in western Collingwood, Hume Street in eastern Collingwood, the intersection with Simcoe Roads91 and 42 in Stayner, and the unsignalised junction with Simcoe Road27 (formerly Highway 27) north of Barrie.

Several portions of Highway26 are maintained under a Connecting Link agreement. Within Owen Sound, Meaford, Thornbury, Collingwood, Stayner and Barrie, maintenance of the route is shared between the MTO and the local municipality.

History 

Highway26 was first assumed by the Department of Highways on July2, 1927,
along an existing trunk route between Barrie and Owen Sound.
It began at a shared terminus with Highway6 and Highway10 in downtown Owen Sound, at the present intersection of 2nd Avenue East and 10th Street, and travelled  to Highway11 in Barrie, at the intersection of Bayfield Street and Dunlop Street.

The gap between Woodford and Meaford was paved in 1930,
followed by the section from the current intersection of Simcoe County Road53 (Wilson Drive) east to Midhurst and south to Highway11 in Barrie in 1931.
In 1932, the section from the Grey and Simcoe County boundary (at Simcoe County Road34/ Grey County Road21) to Stayner was paved.
The gap between there, through Minesing, to Simcoe County Road53 was paved with a single lane in 1934. That year also aw the section between Thornbury and the Simcoe–Grey County line paved, completing a continuous pavement between Owen Sound and Barrie.
The second lane of pavement between Stayner and west of Midhurst was completed over a decade later, in 1947.

Since then, the route has remained almost unchanged, except in the Collingwood and Barrie areas. Prior to the completion of the Pretty River Parkway in Collingwood in the mid-1970s,
Highway26 was routed through Collingwood along Hume Street, before making a 90degree right turn (north) at the intersection with Highway24 (Now Simcoe Road124, Hurontario Street) with which it was concurrent until the terminus of Highway24 at First Street, where Highway26 makes a 90degree left turn (west) onto First Street, continuing on the present route.
The Pretty River Parkway was a bypass of this highly congested downtown route, branching off to the north from Hume Street and swinging gradually westward along the shoreline until becoming Huron Street, which is the eastward extension of First Street beyond Hurontario. In 2003, Pretty River Parkway was widened to four lanes to match the existing sections of Huron and First Streets. 

In 2001, the Georgian Triangle Area Transportation Study determined that traffic levels along Highway26 both east and west of Collingwood were exceeding capacity. The Simcoe Area Transportation Network Needs Assessment repeated this analysis the following year.
Subsequently, work on a new bypass east of Collingwood began on April11, 2003.
The old route was a dangerous section of road with numerous intersecting side streets and private residences with direct highway entrances, while the bypass is a fully-controlled access four-lane divided highway without any at-grade crossings.
The new alignment has the highway veer west in the west end of Wasaga Beach, and from a roundabout with Mosley Street it runs parallel to and south of the old route to a roundabout at Poplar Sideroad, near the eastern town limits of Collingwood. The bypass opened on November14, 2012.
The former route is now known as Beachwood Road from Collingwood to Mosley Street in Wasaga Beach. The remaining section of the former alignment south of Mosley Street has been renamed Lyons Court.

Within Barrie, a portion of Highway26 was transferred to the city in 1998, truncating it at Highway400. This former portion is now known simply as Bayfield Street.

Major intersections

Gallery

References

External links 

Kings Highway 26 at OntHighways

026
Collingwood, Ontario
Transport in Owen Sound
Transport in Grey County
Transport in Barrie